The 12th Annual Screen Actors Guild Awards ceremony, honoring the best in film and television acting achievement for the year 2005, took place on January 29, 2006, at the Los Angeles Shrine Exposition Center, in Los Angeles, California. It was the 10th consecutive year the ceremony was held at the center. The nominees were announced on January 5, 2006, and the event was televised live by both TNT and TBS. It was the first ever year TBS televised the ceremony, while it was the 9th consecutive year that TNT had aired it.

Among the contenders for the film awards Brokeback Mountain received the highest number of nominations with four. Capote and Crash received the second highest number with three each. No film however received more than one award. In the television categories the mini-series Empire Falls and the spin-off series Boston Legal led the nominees with four nominations each. Desperate Housewives was the only series which won more than one award, two in total.

The Screen Actors Guild Life Achievement Award was presented to the former child actress Shirley Temple Black.

Winners and nominees
Winners are listed first and highlighted in boldface.

Screen Actors Guild Life Achievement Award 
 Shirley Temple Black

Film

Television

In Memoriam 
Samuel L. Jackson presented a visual salute to the members of the guild who died in 2005:

 Sandra Dee
 Eddie Albert
 Barbara Bel Geddes
 Bob Denver
 James Doohan
 Dana Elcar
 Wendie Jo Sperber
 J. D. Cannon
 Harold J. Stone
 Sheree North
 Don Adams
 Teresa Wright
 Lloyd Bochner
 Mason Adams
 Lane Smith
 Thurl Ravenscroft
 John Raitt
 Lou Rawls
 John Vernon
 Len Dressler
 John Fiedler
 Barney Martin
 Ruth Hussey
 Ford Rainey
 Brock Peters
 John Mills
 Frances Langford
 June Haver
 Dan O'Herlihy
 Geraldine Fitzgerald
 Anthony Franciosa
 Stephen Elliot
 Paul Winchell
 Frank Gorshin
 Shelley Winters
 Anne Bancroft
 Louis Nye
 Vincent Schiavelli
 John Spencer
 Pat Morita
 Richard Pryor

References

External links
 SAG Awards official site 
 DigitalHit.com 12th Annual SAG Awards Photos

2005
2005 film awards
2005 television awards
2005 guild awards
2005 in American television
2005 in California
2005 in American cinema
January 2006 events in the United States